Dominik Schulz (born 16 March 1992) is a retired German tennis player.

Schulz has a career high ATP singles ranking of 747 achieved on 15 April 2013. He also has a career high ATP doubles ranking of 445 achieved on 10 February 2014.

Schulz made his ATP main draw debut at the 2013 Power Horse Cup in the doubles draw partnering Richard Becker.

Junior Grand Slam finals

Boys' Doubles 1 (1 runner-up)

ATP Challenger and ITF Futures finals

Doubles: 10 (5–5)

External links
 
 

1992 births
Living people
German male tennis players
Tennis players from Munich